Snepvangers is a surname. Notable people with the surname include:

Bram Snepvangers (born 1976), Dutch Magic: The Gathering player
Diego Snepvangers (born 1998), Dutch footballer